Duke Wartislaw IX of Pomerania-Wolgast (c. 1400 – 17 April 1457, Wolgast) was the eldest son of the Duke Barnim VI, Duke of Pomerania (dynasty of Griffins) and Veronica of Hohenzollern, daughter of Frederick V, Burgrave of Nuremberg. He reigned from 1417 until his death in 1457 and he married Sophia of Saxe-Lauenburg-Ratzeburg in 1420. She was the daughter of Eric IV, Duke of Saxe-Lauenburg. They had 4 children: Eric II, Wartislav X, Elizabeth and Christopher (who died young).

In his youth, Wartislaw IX had some bad experiences.  The High Marshall of Pomerania-Wolgast, Degener Buggenhagen was killed before his eyes in 1417 or 1419 by Henneke von Behr, the favorite of the Duchess Agnes, widow of his uncle Wartislav VIII.  He did this because Buggenhagen had previously killed Curdt Bonow, another of the duchess's favorite.  Henneke von Behr was prosecuted.  Some sources say he drowned trying to escape from Usedom Castle; other sources say he was taken prisoner in his castle at Nustrow and executed in Stralsund.  Probably influenced by these events, Wartislav IX agreed with the cities and nobility of his country on the establishment of a Quatember Court, to ensure the rule of law.

From 1425, Wartislav had to share power in Western Pomerania north of the Peene river with his brother Barnim VII and his cousins Barnim VIII and Swantibor IV.  However, he outlived them all and at the end of his life he ruled Pomerania-Wolgast west of Swine river alone.  Like his cousins in Stettin, he had to deal with the ambitions of the House of Hohenzollern, who ruled neighbouring Brandenburg from 1411 onwards.  His worries focused on the Brandenburger estates of Torgelow and Pasewalk, which the Dukes of Wolgast held since 1369 as securities for a loan.  A peace treaty of 1448 transferred ownership of these estates to Pomerania.

In the so-called Golden Privilege of 1452, Wartislav granted extensive concessions to the cities, especially the powerful city of Stralsund (led by mayor Otto Voge). A lasting legacy was the founding of the University of Greifswald in 1456.

Ancestors

References and sources

References

Dukes of Pomerania
1400s births
1457 deaths
Year of birth uncertain
People associated with the University of Greifswald